Insidious: Chapter 2 is a 2013 American supernatural horror film directed by James Wan. The film is a sequel to the 2010 film Insidious, and the second installment in the Insidious franchise, and the fourth in terms of the series's in-story chronology. The film stars Patrick Wilson and Rose Byrne, reprising their roles as Josh and Renai Lambert, a husband and wife who seek to uncover the secret that has left them dangerously connected to the spirit world. The film was released September 13, 2013. A prequel film, Insidious: Chapter 3, was released on June 5, 2015, and the storyline of this film will be continued in Insidious: Fear the Dark in 2023.

Plot 
In 1986, Lorraine Lambert summons demonologist Elise Rainier to help her son Josh, who is being haunted by the spirit of an old woman. While searching for any paranormal phenomena in the home, Elise's arm is slashed by an unseen force. She insists that they must suppress Josh's astral projection abilities for his own safety and plant altered memories in his brain.

Twenty-five years later, Josh's wife, Renai Lambert, is under questioning about the death of Elise. She is warned that if Josh's fingerprints are found at the crime scene, he will be prosecuted for Elise's murder. Josh, Renai and their children – Dalton, Foster, and Cali – relocate to Lorraine's house, where they again begin to encounter strange paranormal events. Dalton tells his mother that he has been having bad dreams about a woman in a white dress, as well as hearing Josh talk to an unseen figure. Renai receives a call from the police stating that the fingerprints do not match Josh's. A woman in a white dress attacks Renai and Josh hears a voice urging him to kill his family.

Specs and Tucker, Elise's former associates, show Lorraine a videotape of the 1986 investigation, enhanced to reveal an adult Josh standing behind the young Josh. They contact Elise's former colleague Carl, who attempts to contact Elise's spirit. They are told to find answers at an abandoned hospital, where Lorraine used to work as a doctor. Lorraine recounts the story twenty-five years ago when a patient named Parker Crane who was admitted for trying to castrate himself, had assaulted Josh. She saw Parker some days later and when she asked a nurse why he was out of bed, the nurse seemed confused and told Lorraine that he had jumped to his death the day before. The group goes to the Crane family home where they find a secret room, containing numerous corpses, a black wedding gown and newspaper clippings revealing Parker to be a serial killer known as "The Bride in Black" – who kidnapped and murdered young women while dressed as a woman himself.

Josh's body begins to slowly deteriorate and Renai realizes he is possessed. Lorraine insists that they all get away from Josh. Carl, Specs and Tucker arrive to drug him but he subdues them. Carl awakens in the spirit realm of The Further, where he meets the spirits of the real Josh and Elise. The time moves non-chronologically there, and Josh is able to communicate with himself as a child to locate Parker's house in The Further.

Meanwhile in the physical world, the possessed Josh ambushes Lorraine and Renai. She escapes to the basement with the children and Dalton voluntarily enters The Further to help his father. There, Josh and the others find Parker's house where they witness Parker's mother, Michelle – the woman in the white dress – abusing him and forcing him to act like a girl. Parker had killed his victims at the behest of his mother's spirit. Elise saves Josh and appears to destroy Michelle's spirit, which stops the possessed Josh from murdering his family in the real world.  Carl and Josh escape and Dalton leads them back to the living world, allowing Josh to finally regain control of his body. The Lambert family is finally reunited, with Josh and Dalton once again having their memories suppressed by Carl.

Some time later, Specs and Tucker arrive at the house of a family whose daughter, Allison, is in an unexplained coma. No one, but Allison's younger sister can sense Elise's spirit, due to the potential ability of astral projection, who passes between them, going to Allison's room. She is confronted by an unseen figure, as a creaking sound is heard.

Cast 

 Patrick Wilson as Josh Lambert
 Garrett Ryan as young Josh
 Rose Byrne as Renai Lambert
 Ty Simpkins as Dalton Lambert
 Lin Shaye as Elise Rainier
 Lindsay Seim as young Elise
 Steven Coulter as Carl
 Hank Harris as young Carl
 Barbara Hershey as Lorraine Lambert
 Jocelin Donahue as young Lorraine
 Leigh Whannell as Specs
 Angus Sampson as Tucker
 Andrew Astor as Foster Lambert
 Brynn Bowie and Madison Bowie as Kali Lambert
 Danielle Bisutti as Michelle Crane / Woman in White 
 Tom Fitzpatrick as Old Parker / Bride in Black
 Tyler James Griffin as young Parker. Additionally, Patrick Wilson portrays his character possessed by Crane.
 Michael Beach as Detective Sendal
 J. LaRose as Long Haired Fiend
 Brooke Peoples as Neighbor Jessica
 Edwina Findley as Front Desk Nurse Hillary
 Stephanie Pearson as Dark-haired woman
 Jorge Pallo as Brian
 Priscilla Garita as Natalie
 Jenna Ortega as Annie
 Dannay Rodriguez as Allison

Production

Development 

After the financial success of Insidious In April 2011, discussions for a sequel soon followed. With producer Jason Blum insisting on the return of director James Wan and screenwriter Leigh Whannell, a treatment script did not arrive until nearly a year later. "As long as there was a chance that James and Leigh were gonna write the second movie and direct the second movie, I didn't want to do it with someone else," said Blum. "They kept saying they might do it, they might not do it, which was why there's quite a bit of time between the two movies." On February 2, 2012, it was announced that director James Wan and screenwriter Leigh Whannell were in talks to return for the sequel.

While promoting The Conjuring (2013) at New York Comic Con in October 2012, Wan described how he and Whannell were working closely on developing the story and the script for the follow up to Insidious, explaining to ShockTilYouDrop.com, "I think the sequel to Insidious is kind of my reaction to Saw where for my own reason I wasn't as involved in the sequels, and so I felt with Insidious, think it would be good to shepherd it and keep it more in track to the version I had when I made the first film so that it doesn't detour too far."

The film was titled Insidious: Chapter 2 because it is a direct continuation of the first installment. However, the tone of the film was to be more grounded than in the first film, with Wan citing his work on The Conjuring as an influence to how he and Whannell approached Insidious: Chapter 2. "I pulled things from Insidious that I applied to The Conjuring, and what I learned from The Conjuring I applied to Insidious 2," said Wan. "So for me, I feel like it's a cumulative filmmaking experience that I've gathered over the years."

Casting 
On November 19, 2012, it was officially announced that Patrick Wilson, Rose Byrne, Lin Shaye, and Ty Simpkins would reprise their roles from the first film. The following month, it was announced that Barbara Hershey would also be returning. In February 2013, Jocelin Donahue and Lindsay Seim rounded out the cast as younger versions of Hershey and Shaye's characters, respectively. It was also confirmed that the film's screenwriter Leigh Whannell and actor Angus Sampson would reprise their roles as Specs and Tucker, respectively. When asked about the return of the two characters, Whannell explained, "There was this hatred that spewed out from fans saying 'I hated those guys! They sucked! They ruined the movie!' so there will probably be a lot of people out there who will be disappointed to hear that the Specs and Tucker characters will be coming back."

Filming 
Principal photography for Insidious: Chapter 2 began on January 15, 2013, in Los Angeles. Having a slightly higher production budget than its predecessor, the film was captured over the course of 25 shooting days. A bulk of the film was shot at a house in Highland Park, Los Angeles, which served as the location of Lorraine Lambert's house. Another location used for filming was the former Linda Vista Community Hospital, which was redressed as a hospital setting and used for the construction of interior sets (including recreations of sets from the first film). "I've never shot in Linda Vista," said Wan about the location. "It's kind of funny because Leigh and I have always heard so much about it. For research on the first one [Leigh] came here to do a bit of ghost-hunting. And I think a lot of that inspired us when we needed a hospital set."

Music 
The musical score to Insidious: Chapter 2 is composed by Joseph Bishara, who previously collaborated with director James Wan on the first installment as well as The Conjuring. "Finding the right range and tone for the feeling is an important part," described Bishara on generating tension through sound. "James is very particular with sting placement along with Kirk, our editor on both Insidious films and Conjuring. Silence can create a listening space, where rather than give you something else to listen to it enables you to hear things."

A soundtrack album for the film was released digitally on September 15 and in physical forms on October 8, 2013, by Void Recordings. Additional songs featured in the film include:
 "Waiting For You" by Alan Ett
 "Piano Sonata in B-flat Minor, Op. 35, 3rd movement" by Frédéric Chopin

Distribution

Marketing 
In April 2013, the first promotional poster for the film went on display at CinemaCon in Las Vegas. The first theatrical trailer for the film was screened to a live audience on location at the Linda Vista Community Hospital on June 4, 2013, with an online release the following day. On August 10, 2013, it was announced at the convention Scare L.A by producer Jason Blum and Universal's creative director John Murdy, that a maze attraction entitled "Insidious: Into the Further" will be featured at the 2013 Halloween Horror Nights at Universal Studios Hollywood.

Theatrical release 
While originally intended to be released on August 30, 2013, Insidious: Chapter 2 was rescheduled for a September 20 release date. The film's release date was later moved again to September 13, 2013.

On the night prior to its theatrical wide release, the film was shown in select theatres as part of a double feature with the first installment. A red carpet premiere for the film was held in Los Angeles on September 10, 2013.

Release

Box office 
Preliminary reports had the film tracking for a $32–$35 million debut in North America. The film earned $1.5 million from its Thursday night showings, and reached a $20 million Friday total, making it the biggest opening day in September box office history. It  went on to be the number one film during its opening weekend, taking $41 million at the box office. The film grossed a worldwide total of $161,919,318 against a budget of $5 million.

Critical response 
Review aggregate Rotten Tomatoes reports a 38% approval rating based on 130 reviews, with an average score of 4.8/10. The site's consensus reads: "Insidious: Chapter 2 is decidedly short on the tension and surprises that made its predecessor so chilling." Metacritic, another review aggregator, assigned the film a weighted average score of 40 out of 100 based on 30 reviews from mainstream critics, indicating "mixed or average reviews".

Robbie Collin of The Telegraph gave the film a positive review, stating that "the scares are mostly very scary indeed, and that means the film does its job." Scott Foundas of Variety praised the "artfully eerie" cinematography work of John R. Leonetti and the "pervasively unsettling atmosphere" constructed by sound designer and editor Joe Dzuban. Foundas further wrote that "where so many sequels seem like mere remakes of their predecessors, with bigger budgets and less imagination, Insidious: Chapter 2 feels like a genuine continuation of characters we enjoyed getting to know the first time around, and wouldn't at all mind returning to again." Conversely, Robert Abele of the Los Angeles Times commented, "After the pleasurable free fall into old-fashioned nightmare artistry that was last summer's The Conjuring, this busy-yet-dull sequel feels like Wan robotically flexing his manipulation of fright-film signposts, an exercise more silly than sinister." Justin Lowe of The Hollywood Reporter wrote, "Setting aside the movie's tediously lame dialogue, self-conscious performances and frequently predictable scares, the narrative's compulsively shifting chronology intermittently manages to engage, although it does little to obscure the distracting shortcomings of both plot and character development."

Home media 
The film was released on Blu-ray and DVD on December 10, 2013.

Prequel 

On September 16, 2013, a third film in the series was announced with Leigh Whannell signed on to return as writer while Jason Blum and Oren Peli were also set to produce. When asked about returning for another sequel, actor Patrick Wilson went on to say that he "[doesn't] know where else it could go", and that "[Josh Lambert has] been through the wringer, and I think the movie sets it up well at the end ... And that's great, that's how it should end." On March 11, 2014, it was reported that the third film wouldn't focus on the Lambert family, but would focus on a new family and story, that it wouldn't connect to the last teaser scene in the second film, and that Whannell and Sampson wouldn't return as ghost hunters Specs and Tucker. On May 7, 2014, Wan tweeted that Whannell would be directing the third film, which would mark his directorial debut. Stefanie Scott and Dermot Mulroney starred in the film. Focus Features and Stage 6 Films released the follow-up on June 5, 2015.

Sequel
In October 2020, it was announced that a sequel to Chapter 2 was in development. Patrick Wilson will serve as director in addition to reprising his starring role, while Scott Teems serves as screenwriter, based on an original story by Leigh Whannell. The premise will center around a now-grown Dalton Lambert as he goes off to college, with Ty Simpkins reprising the role. Jason Blum, James Wan, Leigh Whannell, and Oren Pelli will serve as producers. The project will be a produced by Blumhouse Productions and distributed by Sony Pictures.

See also
 List of ghost films

References

External links 
 
 
 
 
 
 

2013 films
2013 horror films
2013 horror thriller films
2013 independent films
2010s ghost films
2010s supernatural horror films
2010s supernatural thriller films
American ghost films
American haunted house films
American independent films
American sequel films
American supernatural horror films
American supernatural thriller films
FilmDistrict films
Films about spirit possession
Films directed by James Wan
Films produced by Jason Blum
Films scored by Joseph Bishara
Blumhouse Productions films
Films set in 1986
Films shot in Los Angeles
Films with screenplays by Leigh Whannell
2
LGBT-related horror films
Stage 6 Films films
Transgender-related films
2010s English-language films
2010s American films
Demons in film